Isadora Duncan, the Biggest Dancer in the World is a BBC Television film based on the life of the American dancer Isadora Duncan first broadcast on 22 September 1966. The film was directed and produced by Ken Russell and written by Sewell Stokes and Russell. It starred Vivian Pickles and Peter Bowles.

Plot
The film is a biopic of American dancer Isadora Duncan.

Cast
 Vivian Pickles as Isadora Duncan
 Peter Bowles as Paris Singer
 Alexei Jawdokimov as Sergei Yessenin
 Murray Melvin as Photographer
 Jeanne Le Bars as Wilma
 Alita Naughton as Journalist
 Sandor Elès as Bugatti
 Michael Palin as Jazz Band Undertaker (uncredited)
 Eric Idle as Jazz Band Chauffeur (uncredited)

Production
Sewell Stokes, a friend of the dancer towards the very end of her life when she was penniless and alone, wrote a memoir of his conversations with her, shortly after her death, entitled Isadora, an Intimate Portrait (1928). He narrates this film. Two years after the first broadcast of the TV film, Vanessa Redgrave played the role of Isadora Duncan in the big-screen biopic Isadora.

Russell's biographer Joseph Lanza believes that "of all his television work, Isadora is his most accomplished". It explores his "ongoing theme of art being a thing of both glory and vulgarity"

Reception
Bill Gibron from DVD Talk gave the film a positive review and stated: "Herself trained as a dancer, Pickles lights up the screen when she's onstage, Duncan's inflated ego disappearing into a series of carefully choreographed interpretations. Still, some might find the constant confrontations and shouting matches tiring. After all, Russell makes it clear that this was one artist who could have had it all had she just kept her mighty yap shut. Because she didn't, however, we see her downfall in all its brazen glory."

Michael Brooke, in his article for the BFI's Screenonline website describes Pickles' performance as a "gloriously vulgar incarnation".

References

External links
 

1966 television films
1966 films
British biographical films
British television films
Films directed by Ken Russell
British dance films
Cultural depictions of Isadora Duncan
1960s dance films
Biographical films about entertainers
1960s English-language films
1960s British films